The Saline Valley Formation is a geologic formation in the Mojave Desert, in Inyo County, California.

It is located in the Saline Valley of northwestern Death Valley National Park.

It preserves fossils dating back to the Cambrian period.

See also

 List of fossiliferous stratigraphic units in California
 Paleontology in California

References
 

Cambrian California
Death Valley National Park
Geologic formations of California
Geology of Inyo County, California
Natural history of the Mojave Desert
Natural history of Inyo County, California
Cambrian System of North America